Gravitas Recordings (also called Gravitas Music) is an American record label founded in 2011 by Jesse Brede. It is an Austin, Texas based record label and creative collective that serves as a platform for international artists to showcase their work. The mantra of the multi-genre electronic music label, "doing good with good music," has become a way of life. Since its inception in 2011, Gravitas boasts over 156 releases from a selection of producers worldwide.

Fueled by its passion to give talented musicians and visualists a platform to share their work, the company also simultaneously strives to give back to the community by raising money for various charitable causes through compilation albums. Beyond its philanthropic initiatives, the brand's focus is to release quality music that is accessible to anyone via Gravitas’ signature “pay-what-you-want” delivery model. Gravitas was one of the Roman virtues, along with pietas, dignitas and virtus. It may be translated variously as weight, seriousness, dignity, or importance, and connotes a certain substance or depth of personality.

Charitable works
Neurovation
The compilation "Neurovation" was released in September 2012. The album featured various artists such as Gramatik, Mochipet, EdIT and more. All sales from the proceeds of this album went to the non-profit organization "Charity: Water".

Beat ALS Volume 1
In 2014, Gravitas assembled another compilation featuring new music from world-renowned artists such as BT, Bassnectar, Richie Hawtin, and John Acquaviva to name a few. Profits from sales benefited "Every90Minutes", an organization that raises money and awareness for ALS or "Lou Gehrigs disease"

DEFCON Soundtrack, Vol. 20-24
Gravitas has released the soundtrack for DEF CON every year since 2012. Proceeds go to the activist non-profit organization "Electronic Frontier Foundation" that advocates digital rights.

Circulate, Vol 1: Curated by David Starfire & SOOHAN

Gravitas released a world bass compilation with David Starfire and SOOHAN in 2019 to raise money for Beyond the Grade, an Austin-based non-profit that offers music education for underserved children. 100% of net proceeds were donated.

Awards
 2019 - "Label of the Year"
 2014 - "Most Giving Label" 
 2013 - "Label of the Year"  and "Breakthrough Label of the Year"

Artists and alumni
 Active Artists
Amp Live
AHEE
Au5
Bassline Drift
Brede
Cloudchord
CloZee
Chamberlain
COFRESI
Cristina Soto
Cualli
David Starfire
DISSOLV
Dubvirus
Dysphemic
Edamame
Esseks
Equanimous
Father Bear
Fractal Sky
Govinda
Grand Tapestry
High Step Society
Illustrated
JPod
Lil Fish
Megan Hamilton
MORiLLO
Mr. Bill
Of The Trees
Psy Fi
Psymbionic
Savej
Somatoast
SOOHAN
Vokab Kompany
VOLO
Wolf-e-wolf
Zebbler Encanti Experience
Alumni
 Supersillyus
Said the Sky
Illenium
 Electrocado
 Space Jesus
 Minnesota
Ill-esha
 Soulacybin
 Mindex
 Kermode
 AMB
 Unlimited Gravity
 Marvel Years
 Devin Riggins
 The Digital Connection
 Soulular
 Perkulat0r

Charity compilation artists
 Bassnectar
 edIT
 Machinedrum
 Dub FX
 Matthew Dear
 Gramatik
 Mochipet
 John Acquaviva
 Julian Gray
 Nicolas Jaar
 Richie Hawtin
 Tritonal
 Kraddy
 Starkey
Opiuo
DJ Madd
Buku
ill.Gates
Tritonal

References

External links
Gravitas Releases on Beatport
Gravitas Recordings catalog on Discogs.com
Gravitas Recordings Bandcamp discography

American record labels
Electronic music record labels
Vanity record labels
Dubstep record labels